The name Tina has been used for five tropical cyclones worldwide:

In the Eastern Pacific:
 Hurricane Tina (1992) – second longest-lived Eastern Pacific hurricane
 Tropical Storm Tina (2016) – a short-lived, weak tropical storm

In the Western Pacific:
 Typhoon Tina (1997) (T9711, 12W, Huling)

In the Southern Hemisphere:
 Cyclone Tina (1974) – formed in late April
 Cyclone Tina (1990) – crossed western Australia

Pacific hurricane set index articles
Pacific typhoon set index articles
Australian region cyclone set index articles